McVitie's is a British snack food brand owned by United Biscuits. The name derives from the original Scottish biscuit maker, McVitie & Price, Ltd., established in 1830 on Rose Street in Edinburgh, Scotland. The company moved to various sites in the city before completing the St Andrews Biscuit Works factory on Robertson Avenue in the Gorgie district in 1888. The company also established one in Glasgow and two large manufacturing plants south of the border, in Heaton Chapel, Stockport, and Park Royal, London. There are seven McVitie's factories in the UK, with each producing a different types of biscuit; the Harlesden site in north-west London manufactures the chocolate digestives.

Under United Biscuits McVitie's held a Royal Warrant from Queen Elizabeth II. The best-selling biscuit manufacturer in the United Kingdom, McVitie's produces chocolate digestives, Hobnobs and Rich tea (ranked the three favourite biscuits to dunk into tea), and Jaffa Cakes (the best selling cake in the UK). In 2020, sales of McVitie's biscuits in the UK were more than five times the next two competitors.

History

Robert McVitie was born in Dumfries in 1809. He served an apprenticeship with a baker and in 1834 he moved to Edinburgh. He initially lived and worked at 130 Rose Street, just north of Princes Street in the New Town. In 1835 he moved to the adjacent building at 129 Rose Street. It was called a "provision Shop". In 1843 he opened a second shop at 14 Charlotte Place, just west of Charlotte Square (later renamed Randolph Place).

McVitie's is first described as a "baker and confectioner" rather than a provision shop in 1856 at 5 Charlotte Place. He used the basement area below the shop as the bakery. By 1865 the bakery had moved to 47 London Street at the east end of town and he was living nearby in a flat at 76 Broughton Street.

Robert McVitie had two biscuit works at the head of Leith Walk in Edinburgh in 1870: 12 Antigua Street and 2 East London Street. McVitie lived nearby in a flat at 76 Broughton Street.

Robert retired in 1880 and died in 1884 leaving his eldest son Robert McVitie (1854-1910) to run the business. It was only then that the business abandoned bread and cakes to concentrate on biscuits, largely due to their longer lifespan. In 1887 he employed Alexander Grant from Forres, an experienced biscuit maker, to aid in this. He was employed as foreman of the bakery but left to set up his own bakery in Inverness but this failed and he returned to McVitie's.

In 1875 the company had been joined by Charles Edward Price as a salesman. His success in this role led to a partnership in 1888 to create McVitie & Price. In 1888 they built the huge St Andrews Biscuit Works on Robertson Avenue in the Gorgie district of south-west Edinburgh. Price left in 1910 following the death of Robert.

In 1891 the London salesman for the company George Andrews Brown persuaded the company to redesign their Rich Tea biscuit to a smaller size to accommodate the London taste. In 1898 McVitie rebranded the company McVities Guest after joining with his brother-in-law Edward Graham Guest. In 1903 they built the renowned McVities Guest Tearoom at 135/136 Princes Street. The original Gorgie factory burned down in 1894, but was rebuilt the same year to a much improved technical standard. It remained operative until 1969 when production ceased and operations were transferred to the English sites which had been established at Harlesden, north-west London in 1902 which is the largest biscuit factory in the UK, and Manchester in 1914. 

Robert McVitie died married but childless in 1910 in Berkhamsted rather than at his home 12 Greenhill Gardens in south Edinburgh. He is commemorated in Dean Cemetery in Edinburgh. Prior to death he set up the company (retaining the name McVitie's) as a limited company placing Alexander Grant as managing director and principal share-holder.

The firm acquired the Edinburgh bakery of Simon Henderson & Sons in 1922. McVitie & Price merged with another Scottish bakery company, Macfarlane, Lang & Co., Ltd, in 1948 to become United Biscuits Group. McVitie's brand products are now manufactured in five United Kingdom factories: the two former McVitie & Price factories in Harlesden and Stockport, a former Macfarlane, Lang & Co. factory named Victoria Biscuit Works in Glasgow, a former Carr's factory named The Biscuit Works established 1831 in Carlisle, and the McVitie's Cake Co. factory (formerly Riley's Toffee Works) in Halifax.

McVitie & Price's first major biscuit was the McVitie's digestive, created in 1892 by a new young employee at the company named Alexander Grant. The biscuit was given its name because it was thought that its high baking soda content served as an aid to food digestion. Grant was later to become managing director of the company. In 1923 he was the main benefactor in establishing the National Library of Scotland giving an endowment of £100,000. Grant donated a further £100,000 in 1928 to assist with the building of the National Library premises on George IV Bridge in Edinburgh.

In 1924 Ramsay MacDonald, prime minister of Britain’s new Labour Government, admitted that Grant had given him a Daimler car and £30,000 of shares in the McVitie and Price company. Grant had been MacDonald’s childhood friend, and shortly after received a baronetcy (hereditary knighthood) from the prime minister. The affair, regarded by many as corruption by the prime minister, severely shook the government.

The McVitie's Chocolate Homewheat Digestive was created in 1925. Over 71 million packets of McVitie's chocolate digestives are eaten in the United Kingdom each year, equating to 52 biscuits per second. Hobnobs were launched in 1985 and a milk chocolate variant followed in 1987. Launched in 1927, Jaffa Cakes  were ranked the best selling cake or biscuit in the UK in 2012.

Some of the products in the McVitie's line were rebranded McV in 2002, but this was replaced in 2005 with a restyled version of the McVitie's brand logo. In 2007, United Biscuits licensed the McVitie's brand to Meiji Seika Kaisha Ltd for biscuit production in Japan.

In 2009, McVitie's biscuits were voted the most popular biscuits to dunk in tea, with McVitie's chocolate digestives, Rich tea and Hobnobs ranked the country's top three favourite biscuits in 2009.

In June 2014, McVitie's announced their intention to make 157 shop floor roles redundant at their Stockport manufacturing facility. This redundancy announcement was also due to the modernisation agenda of the company and also involves a move from an 8-hour 5-day operation, to a 12-hour 7-day operation. In November 2014, United Biscuits, and hence also McVitie's, became owned by Turkish company Yildiz which in 2016 merged some of its subsidiaries including United Biscuits as pladis. 

In 2020, sales of McVitie's biscuits in the United Kingdom were more than five times their closest two competitors in the biscuit category (Kit Kat and Cadbury biscuits). In 2022, McVitie's became the main sponsor of Britain's Got Talent.

Wedding cakes

Although not their core operation it is noteworthy that McVitie's were commissioned in 1893 to create a wedding cake for the royal wedding between the Duke of York and Princess Mary, who subsequently became King George V and Queen Mary. This cake was over 2 metres high and cost 140 guineas. It was viewed by 14,000 and was wonderful publicity for the company. They received many commissions for royal wedding cakes and christening cakes. In 1947, McVitie & Price made the principal wedding cake for Princess Elizabeth and Philip Mountbatten, which was served at the wedding breakfast. McVitie's were commissioned to make a chocolate biscuit cake as a groom's cake for the Wedding of Prince William and Catherine Middleton in 2011.

Products

Biscuits

Abbey Crunch
All Butter Shortbread
BN
Chocolate Digestives
Club Biscuits.
Cookies, including Boasters. 
Deli Choc
Digestives
Digestives Lights
Fig Roll
Fruit shortcake
Ginger Nuts
Gold Bar
Hobnobs
Iced Gems
Marie finger biscuit
Minis
Penguin
Rich Tea
Tasties
Taxi
Trio
United (discontinued)
V.I.Bs (Very Important Biscuits)

Cakes

Carrot Cake
Fruit cake
Jaffa Cakes
Jamaica Ginger Cake
Lemon Cake
Lyle's Golden Syrup Cake
Mini Rolls
Moments Brownies
Tunis Cake
 Waffles

Other snacks

Breakfast
Cheddars
Cracker Crisps
Blissfills
Digestive Thins
Family Circle
Krackawheats
McVities Digestive Slices
Minis
Mini Cheddars
Nibbles (Digestive and Hobnob varieties)
Victoria Biscuit Selection

See also

Burton's Foods
Fox's Biscuits
Jacob Fruitfield Food Group
Huntley & Palmers
Sunshine Biscuits (Australia), a licensed manufacturer of McVitie's biscuits

References

External links

United Biscuits - page on McVitie's.

Food and drink companies of Scotland
Biscuit brands
British brands
Scottish brands
United Biscuits brands
Manufacturing companies based in Edinburgh
Food and drink companies established in 1830
1830 establishments in Scotland
British Royal Warrant holders
Gorgie
History of Edinburgh